Laurie Taylor (12 October 1918 – 18 October 1980) was an Australian rules footballer who played in the Victorian Football League (VFL) for the Richmond Football Club and in the South Australian National Football League (SANFL) for West Adelaide and Glenelg Football Clubs.

Taylor was 6'2", an inch taller than fellow Richmond ruckman Jack Dyer and was a well-built centre-half forward, renowned for his strong marking.

War service
Taylor served with the 2nd AIF in Borneo during World War II.

Shoulder dislocation
On 17 May 1947, in the first match that Taylor played after his discharge from the A.I.F., Richmond was playing Hawthorn and Taylor was playing in the ruck. At the first bounce, Taylor punched the ball an amazing 40 yd (37 m) and, at the same time, dislocated his shoulder.

The Taylor football family
Laurie's record as a player and as a coach is impressive:
 1936–1937, West Adelaide Juniors
 1937–1941, 1946, West Adelaide 44 games (127 goals)
 1944, West Adelaide/Genelg: 1 game (1 goal)
 South Australian Interstate Team: 5 games (7 goals)
 1944, 1947, Richmond: 20 games (48 goals, including five 5-goal matches)
 1948: Corowa, captain-coach. Also represented New South Wales in interstate football?
 1949: Coolamon Football Club captain-coach. Represented NSW v Victoria.
 1950, 1952, Glenelg: 28 games (60 goals)
 1951, Coolamon, captain-coach.
 1953–1954: Naracoorte, captain-coach, 1953 & 54 premiership coach.
 1955–1956: West Gambier, Captain-coach

His family were also steeped in football.
 John Taylor Sr., his father, played 56 games with SANFL club Port Adelaide including their 1914 team which was unbeaten for the entire season.
 John Taylor Jr., his brother, played 258 games for SANFL clubs West Adelaide and Glenelg as both player and as captain-coach. He played for South Australia five times. He was the first SANFL player to play 250 games.
 Don Taylor, his other brother, played 20 senior games for South Melbourne in 1942 and 1947. On 30 August 1947, in round 19, South Melbourne played Richmond at the Punt Road Oval; Laurie Taylor was the Richmond full-forward, and Don Taylor was the South Melbourne full-forward. Laurie Taylor kicked 5 goals for Richmond, and was one of the best on the ground, whilst Don kicked two goals for South Melbourne. He also played 136 senior games for West Adelaide and Glenelg between 1939 and 1954. He played for South Australia nine times. He also coached West Adelaide in 1965.

Notes

References
 Atkinson, G. (1982) Everything you ever wanted to know about Australian rules football but couldn't be bothered asking, The Five Mile Press: Melbourne. .
 Hansen B: Tigerland: The History of the Richmond Football Club from 1885, Richmond Former Players and Officials Association, (Melbourne), 1989. 
Hogan P: The Tigers of Old, Richmond FC, (Melbourne), 1996. 
 Ross, J. (ed), 100 Years of Australian Football 1897–1996: The Complete Story of the AFL, All the Big Stories, All the Great Pictures, All the Champions, Every AFL Season Reported, Viking, (Ringwood), 1996.

External links

1918 births
Richmond Football Club players
West Adelaide Football Club players
Glenelg Football Club players
Corowa Football Club players
Corowa Football Club coaches
Australian rules footballers from South Australia
1980 deaths
Australian Army personnel of World War II